These are the results of the 50 metre rifle three positions at the 1972 Summer Olympics.  The gold medal went to John Writer of the United States, who was the silver medalist in 1968.  He went on and broke the world record with a score of 1166 points.  The silver medalist was also from the United States, Lanny Bassham, who got off to a poor start, but recovered well enough to claim silver.  Bassham returned 4 years later to claim gold in the same event.

Final
Format: 50 metres; 120 shots.  40 shots prone, 40 shots kneeling and 40 shots standing.  400 possible at each distance, 1200 total points available.  All ties were broken by the best score on the final string of kneeling, if still tied the best score on the final string of standing, followed by prone.

References

External links
Official report pg. 232

Shooting at the 1972 Summer Olympics
Men's 050m 3 positions 1972